The Men's 50 metre backstroke S2 swimming event at the 2004 Summer Paralympics was competed on 27 September. It was won by James Anderson, representing .

1st round

Heat 1
27 Sept. 2004, morning session

Heat 2
27 Sept. 2004, morning session

Final round

27 Sept. 2004, evening session

References

M